Ned Alvin Merriam (October 26, 1884 – July 9, 1956) was an American track athlete, college football player, and coach of track and football.

Merriam attended the University of Chicago, where he starred in football and track between 1905 and 1908.  He was a member of the American track and field team at the 1908 Summer Olympics in London.  In the 400 metres, Merriam won his preliminary heat with a time of 52.2 seconds.  He advanced to the semifinals, where he finished third in his heat to be eliminated from further competition—the only 400-meter race he ever lost.

Merriam later coached track at Iowa State University, Texas A&M University, DePauw University, and Yale University.  He was head track coach at the University of Chicago from 1929 until his retirement in 1950.  He died of leukemia in Chicago in 1956.

In 2011 Merriam was inducted into the University of Chicago Athletics Hall of Fame. His plaque states that he was a three-time Big 10 champion in the 440-yard dash, and a member of the U.S. Olympic Team, served as head track and field coach from 1929 to 1949.

Head coaching record

Football

References

Additional sources
 

1884 births
1956 deaths
American football fullbacks
American male sprinters
Chicago Maroons football players
Chicago Maroons men's track and field athletes
Chicago Maroons track and field coaches
Iowa State Cyclones track and field coaches
DePauw Tigers track and field coaches
Texas A&M Aggies football coaches
Yale Bulldogs track and field coaches
Athletes (track and field) at the 1908 Summer Olympics
Olympic track and field athletes of the United States
People from Lake Geneva, Wisconsin
Players of American football from Wisconsin
Deaths from leukemia